Flabellinopsidae is a taxonomic family of brightly coloured sea slugs, specifically nudibranchs, marine gastropod mollusks.

Genera and species
Genera within the family Flabellinopsidae include:
 Baenopsis baetica Korshunova, Martynov, Bakken, Evertsen, Fletcher, Mudianta, Saito, Lundin, Schrödl & Picton, 2017
 Flabellinopsis MacFarland, 1966

References